"Last Christmas" is a song by British pop duo Wham!, originally released in December 1984 on CBS Records internationally and as a double A-side on Epic Records with "Everything She Wants" in the UK. Described as a "high watermark of mid-80s British synthpop songcraft", it was written and produced by George Michael, and has been covered by many artists since its original release. 

Upon its initial release in 1984, "Last Christmas" spent five consecutive weeks at number two in the UK Singles Chart—it was held off the top spot at Christmas by Band Aid's "Do They Know It's Christmas?" (on which Michael also performed). After many chart runs in subsequent years, which included three more weeks at number two, and which saw the recording become part of RCA Records' catalogue, the song finally reached number one in the UK Singles Chart on New Year's Day 2021 (chart week ending date 7 January 2021), more than 36 years after its initial release. In doing so, it became the fifth UK number one single for the duo. Prior to it reaching number one, "Last Christmas" had for many years held the record as the highest-selling single never to top the charts by the Official Charts Company (OCC) with 1.9 million copies sold (not including streams). This record is now held by "Moves like Jagger" by Maroon 5 featuring Christina Aguilera. The tune reached number one in the UK after it was streamed 9.2 million times in the last week of 2020 and sold 1,555 downloads, resulting in a total of 40,149 combined sales.

Outside the United Kingdom, the song topped the charts in Denmark, Germany, Ireland, Slovenia, and Sweden and peaked within the top ten of the charts in several countries including Australia, Canada and the United States. Wham! donated all of their royalties to relief efforts for the Ethiopian famine. In a UK-wide poll in December 2012, it was voted eighth on the ITV television special The Nation's Favourite Christmas Song and was voted most popular song of the 1980s in Channel 5's Christmas 2020 countdown Britain's Favourite 80's Songs. It was the most-played Christmas song of the 21st century in the UK until it was overtaken by "Fairytale of New York" in 2015.

Development

"Last Christmas" had its beginnings in 1983, while George Michael and Andrew Ridgeley were visiting Michael's parents. It was written by Michael in his childhood bedroom. Michael played Ridgeley the introduction and chorus melody to "Last Christmas", which Ridgeley later called "a moment of wonder".

Recording
The song was recorded in August 1984, at Advision Studios, London, England. George Michael wrote, performed, produced and played every single instrument on the track. With a LinnDrum drum machine, a Roland Juno-60 synth and sleigh bells, they began recording the song in the summer, Michael having "plastered [the studio] in Christmas decorations to set the mood". The only other people in the studio were engineer Chris Porter and two assistants. According to Porter, lyrically "you've got the happiness of the rhythm track, but against that you've got the sadness of the unrequited love".

Chart performance

United Kingdom 

Wham! already had two number one singles on the UK Singles Chart during 1984, and news that they were planning a Christmas single meant that a battle for the coveted Christmas number one spot in Britain seemed set to be between Wham! and the year's other big act, Frankie Goes to Hollywood, who had achieved a third No. 1 in early December with "The Power of Love". However, the Band Aid single written by Bob Geldof and Midge Ure, produced the No. 1 single "Do They Know It's Christmas?", while Wham!'s offering peaked at No. 2 for much of the period. Wham! donated all "Last Christmas/Everything She Wants" royalties to the Ethiopian famine.

In subsequent years, the song entered the UK top 40 on 15 occasions, reaching the top 10 no less than 6 times (including a run of 5 consecutive years between 2016 and 2020). In 1985 and 2017 it equalled its best ever chart position of number two, before finally topping the charts on 1 January 2021, 36 years after its original 1984 release. In the process, "Last Christmas" achieved the chart record for the longest time taken for a single to peak at the top of the UK Singles Chart after its first release, a feat that had previously been held by "(Is This The Way To) Amarillo? by Tony Christie, which topped the chart in March 2005, 33 years and 4 months after its initial release in November 1971. The record has since been surpassed in June 2022 by Kate Bush with "Running Up That Hill", which took 37 years.

Coincidentally with the sudden death of George Michael on December 25, 2016, "Last Christmas" reached number 7 on the UK Singles Chart for 5 weeks (8 December 2016 – 5 January 2017). On January 8, 2021, "Last Christmas" became the very first record to disappear completely from the chart, having held the number one spot the week before, exiting the Official Charts Company Top 100 chart with no placing on the chart (week ending 14 January 2021). As "Last Christmas" replaced "Don't Stop Me Eatin'" by LadBaby, which had dropped down the singles chart to number 78 on January 1, it was the first time in chart history that two back-to-back number ones had disappeared not only from the BBC Radio 1 top 40, but the top 75 as well.

, "Last Christmas" had sold over 1.90 million copies, being at that time the biggest-selling single in UK chart history not to reach number one, and the 10th best-selling UK single overall. It was certified quadruple platinum in December 2021.

In December 2019, it peaked at No. 1 on both the UK Official Vinyl Singles Chart and on the Official Video Streaming Chart. The following week, the song set a new UK chart record and was streamed 17.1 million times, the most number of plays in a week. It became the UK's best-selling vinyl single release in 2019.

Other territories 
In Germany, the song is the most successful Christmas single of all time, having spent 161 weeks on the German Singles Chart and attained a peak position of number one on 24 December 2021. It has charted every year since 1997. In January 2008, the song fell from No. 4 to No. 64 there, also making it the biggest fall out of the top 10 on the singles chart.

The single was originally released in two different formats in Japan with different cover art, a 7-inch and 12-inch vinyl (Long version) both with "Credit Card Baby" as their B-side. The former entered the top 20 of the Oricon Singles Chart peaking at No. 15, while the latter reached No. 47. The single was released in 1993 on CD single in the country and peaked at No. 17, selling nearly 40,000 copies that week. It was reissued in November 2001 and 2004 as a 2-track CD with the single edit and the "Pudding Mix".
As a result of the success, "Last Christmas" is the eighth best-selling single of all time in Japan released by a non-Japanese act, with total physical sales of 683,000 units.

In the Netherlands, the song never reached No. 1, peaking at No. 2 in January 1985 (behind Band Aid's "Do They Know It's Christmas?"). In the Dutch Singles Top 100 (one of three charts in the Netherlands that claims to be the "official" chart, but it is the only one that is not broadcast and remains unpublished except on its own official web page), the song has now entered on 16 different occasions, including every year since 2006. Its highest position after 1984 was No. 4 (during the 2016 and 2018 Christmas season). In the Dutch Mega Top 50 (which was first published in 1993), the song re-appeared in 1997, 2000, 2007, 2008, and 2013.

"Last Christmas" was not released commercially as a single in the United States until November 2014, when it was made available on 12" vinyl as a Record Store Day exclusive. Since then, the song has re-entered the Billboard Holiday Songs Chart on a regular basis, peaking at No. 3 on 7 December 2019.

As of 25 November 2016, total US sales of the digital track stand at 751,000 downloads according to Nielsen SoundScan, placing it 10th on the list of all-time best-selling Christmas/holiday digital singles in US SoundScan history. The song debuted at number 50 on the Billboard Hot 100 in the chart dated 7 January 2017, after George Michael died.
In December 2018, the song re-entered the Hot 100, reaching No. 25 in January 2019, and then a new peak of No. 11 in the first issue of 2020. On the issue dated 2 January 2021, "Last Christmas" reached number nine on the Hot 100, its first foray into the top 10 and returning Wham! to the top 10 after a 35-year break. The following year, on the issue dated 1 January 2022, the song reached number seven. On the issue dated 24 December 2022, the song reached a new peak of number six on the Hot 100. On the year's last issue of the Billboard Hot 100, dated 31 December 2022, "Last Christmas" reached top five. On the magazine Billboard'''s first issue of 2023, dated 7 January, the song reached a new peak of number four on the Billboard Hot 100. According to the Recording Industry Association of America (RIAA), it was certified double platinum in December 2019 and has sold 2 million digital units.

In December 2017, 28 December 2018, December 2019 and December 2021 "Last Christmas" reached No. 1 in the Swedish singles chart.

Music video
The video to "Last Christmas" directed by Andrew Morahan, shows Wham! members George Michael and Andrew Ridgeley accompanying girlfriends to see friends at an unspecified ski resort cottage: the cable-car that can be seen in two shots is from Saas-Fee, Switzerland, where the video was filmed. It becomes clear early on that the character of Ridgeley's girlfriend (played by model Kathy Hill) was previously in a relationship with Michael and that the song is aimed at her. She can be spotted throughout the video by the fact that she is usually wearing red, but everyone else is wearing more muted colors.

There is a brief flashback to a prior Christmas, showing Michael's character presenting Kathy Hill's character with a jewelled brooch. In the present time, Ridgeley is wearing the brooch, suggesting that Hill gave the same gift (perhaps by regifting it) to her new love after she and Michael parted ways. When Hill wears the brooch after receiving it from Michael's character, it is "right side up", and when Ridgeley's character wears it, he wears it "upside down". On numerous occasions, Michael presents a thoughtful expression, suggesting his conflicting emotions. As Michael is decorating the Christmas tree some decoration falls to the floor where Michael's ex-girlfriend is sitting and the ex-couple shares a few seconds of a knowing look at each other.

Her seeming indifference to Ridgeley's open displays of affection makes the viewer wonder if Ridgeley's heart is the next to be broken. At the end of the video, everyone leaves the cottage and when the group get out of the cable-car, they are all properly "paired off" with Michael and his new girlfriend looking happy.

The video also featured the duo's erstwhile backing singers Pepsi and Shirlie.

It has since been rescanned in 4K definition from the original 35mm film. The music video, originally shot on film, was released on 13 December 2019 in 4K Ultra HD resolution. The music video's original film director Andy Morahan found the original 35mm rushes and worked closely with teams at Cinelab London and VFX artist Russ Shaw at Nice Biscuits post production to recreate the video using the higher-resolution film.

Charts

 Weekly charts 

 Year-end charts 

 All-time charts 

Certifications

Release history

Note: When released in 1984 "Last Christmas" and "Everything She Wants" were a double A-side. In some countries, the longer edit (4:34) of "Last Christmas" from 1984 was used on side two of the second 12-inch.
The only difference between the 1988 and 1989 reissues is the text (Christmas '88" and Christmas '89") on the back of the record.

 In other media 
The film Last Christmas (2019) prominently features the music of George Michael, including this song and a previously unreleased track.

The song is featured in the video game Just Dance 2017 as a duet between two dancers, one of whom is dressed as Santa Claus.

Plagiarism allegations
On behalf of the writers of the song "Can't Smile Without You", made popular by Barry Manilow, publishing company Dick James Music sued Michael for plagiarism in the mid-1980s, claiming that "Last Christmas" lifted its melody from the former. The case was dismissed when a musicologist presented 60-odd songs from the past century that had a comparable chord sequence and melody.

Whigfield version

In the UK, the following single planned after "Close to You" was "Big Time"; however, it was suggested that Whigfield should record a version of "Last Christmas" to go with the release of "Big Time", as a double A-side single. The single was also released as a double A-side single in Germany with "Close to You". In other countries, "Last Christmas" was released on its own with various remixes. The single reached number 21 in the UK, which was Whigfield's final release on Systematic Records. It also features on various Special Edition versions of her debut album Whigfield and also on Whigfield II. The EP was released on 10 November 1995 in Australia. A UK single was released on 3 December 1995.

Whigfield's cover of "Last Christmas" was a moderate success in Europe. It managed to climb into the Top 10 in both Denmark and Spain, peaking at number
6 and 5. Additionally, it was a Top 20 hit in Finland and a Top 30 hit in Ireland, Scotland and the United Kingdom. In the latter, the single was released as a double single with "Big Time". It peaked at number 21 in its first week at the UK Singles Chart, on 10 December 1995. It was also a Top 40 hit in Belgium, as well as on the European Hot 100 Singles, where the song reached number 38.

The music video for Whigfield's cover was directed by Italian director Giacomo De Simone. It features Whigfield performing the song in a winter landscape.

Track listing

Charts (Whigfield)

Ashley Tisdale version

"Last Christmas" was recorded in 2006 for Warner Bros. Records by Ashley Tisdale. The song was released to US radios on 11 November 2006 and as a digital download on 21 November 2006. This song was the first single released by Ashley Tisdale in her deal with Warner Bros. Records and became her official first holiday single. Tisdale performed the single in 2007 on Macy's Thanksgiving Day Parade and Christmas in Rockefeller Center, and in 2009 in the Citadel Outlets of Los Angeles, California. The song was one of the B-sides on the European CD singles of Tisdale's first single "Be Good to Me" and Tisdale's second single "He Said She Said", from the album Headstrong. The song has been included on several compilation albums, including Disney Channel Holiday and A Very Special Christmas 7.

 Charts 

Crazy Frog version

"Last Christmas" was covered in 2006 by Crazy Frog and released as a Christmas single. In Belgium, the Netherlands, Australia, New Zealand, Sweden and France, "Last Christmas" was released 12 months before in other countries.

 Charts 

Cascada version

"Last Christmas" was recorded in 2007 by Cascada. It was released on iTunes in November 2007. The single had only a digital release but six days later, it was released on the single "What Hurts the Most" which was the first single from their second album. It was also released as part of their Christmas album, It's Christmas Time. In the UK, despite it being a B-side track, the song is regularly played throughout music channels during the festive season.

 Charts 

{|class="wikitable sortable"
|-
! Chart (2010)
! style="text-align:center;"| Peakposition
|-
| US [[Dance/Electronic Digital Songs|Dance/Electronic Digital Songs Sales (Billboard)]]
| style="text-align:center;"|43
|-
|}

Notes

Glee cast version

The song was covered by the cast of Glee, led by Lea Michele, Cory Monteith with Amber Riley, and was released in 2009 exclusively on iTunes as a charity single, then in 2010 on Glee: The Music, The Christmas Album. The song entered the Billboard Hot 100, becoming the first time a cover version of the song appeared on the chart.

Charts

Joe McElderry version

British singer Joe McElderry covered the song in 2011. This version was released as a single on 19 December 2011, an EP was also released digitally in Ireland on 4 November 2011, and in the UK on 7 November 2011. Joe McElderry's version is taken from his third studio album, Classic Christmas, released 28 November 2011. 7th Heaven Remix & Production have done a remix for the song.

A short music video was made using footage which was filmed for the Classic Christmass album advertising, it features McElderry outside in the snow, collecting logs and taking them to a large house preparing for a Christmas party, a similar video was made for McElderry's version of "O Come All Ye Faithful". The advert and both videos were directed by Steve Lucker.

Ariana Grande version

"Last Christmas" is a song by American singer Ariana Grande. The song serves as the lead single from Grande's Christmas Kisses. It was released on 19 November 2013 in the iTunes Store.

Grande's cover draws primarily from pop music, contemporary R&B and soul and also includes newly written lyrics in place of some of the originals. The verses have been described as "bouncier" than the original melody.

Charts

Certifications

Carly Rae Jepsen version

"Last Christmas" was covered by Canadian singer Carly Rae Jepsen in 2015 and was released to digital retailers on 20 November 2015 through 604 Records (in Canada) and Interscope Records and School Boy Records (internationally). Jepsen's rendition was praised by critics for combining stylistic elements similar to the original with modern production. She performed the song live at the annual NBC television special Christmas in Rockefeller Center airing on 2 December 2015, and on the episode of The Late Late Show with James Corden airing on 16 December 2015.

Bianca Gracie of Idolator described the song as "quintessential Carly" for highlighting Jepsen's unique vocals and synth production and wrote that her cover will "charm your... socks off". Nolan Feeney of Time echoed those sentiments, noting that "Last Christmas" is "the kind of brokenhearted yet warm and sweet song [Jepsen] excels at". Jackson McHenry of Vulture applauded Jepsen for her straightforward approach to the song and avoiding the "vocal gymnastics" that bog down some Christmas covers.

A more critical review came from music blog Popcrush, who deemed the cover overproduced, saying "The slick production is a disservice to both Jepsen's vocals and the original's emotional heft.".

Charts

Other notable cover versions
 Billie Piper originally recorded a cover of the song as a B-side of her 1998 single "She Wants You". It was released as a CD single in limited areas of Europe, charting at No. 47 in Sweden. The single was released as a promotional vinyl single in the UK, limited to 500 copies, and therefore could not chart there.
 Taylor Swift covered "Last Christmas" for her 2007 EP, The Taylor Swift Holiday Collection. Swift's cover peaked at number 28 on the US Billboard Hot Country Songs chart in January 2008 and at number 46 on the Hot Digital Songs chart in December 2008. On Billboard's Greatest of All Time Holiday 100 chart, which measured chart data 1958–2016, Swift's "Last Christmas" charted at number 56.
 Hilary Duff covered the song for her 2002 debut album, Santa Claus Lane. This version peaked at number 68 on the South Korean Gaon Chart in 2012.
 James TW's version in 2018 peaked at number 22 on the New Zealand Hot Singles Chart, and at number 38 on Sverigetopplistan, the official Swedish singles chart.
 Backstreet Boys released a cover of the song on September 6, 2022, as a part of their first Christmas album, A Very Backstreet Christmas. It was accompanied by a music video on November 1 the same year and reached number 1 on the Billboard Holiday AC chart.
 Lauren Spencer-Smith released a cover of the song on November 11, 2022. Her version peaked at number 81 on the Billboard Hot 100 in December 2022.
 Pentatonix featuring Hikakin & Seikin, on their 2022 album Holidays Around the World.

See also
 List of songs which have spent the most weeks on the UK Singles Chart
 Whamageddon

References

1984 songs
1984 singles
1995 singles
2006 singles
2007 singles
2009 singles
2011 singles
2013 singles
2015 singles
2018 singles
2022 singles
Wham! songs
Whigfield songs
Billie Piper songs
Ashley Tisdale songs
Crazy Frog songs
Cascada songs
Taylor Swift songs
Joe McElderry songs
Ariana Grande songs
Carly Rae Jepsen songs
James TW songs
Backstreet Boys songs
Irish Singles Chart number-one singles
Number-one singles in Austria
Number-one singles in Denmark
Number-one singles in Germany
Number-one singles in Iceland
Number-one singles in Sweden
Oricon International Singles Chart number-one singles
UK Singles Chart number-one singles
British Christmas songs
Songs written by George Michael
Song recordings produced by George Michael
Republic Records singles
Columbia Records singles
CBS Records singles
Epic Records singles
Innocent Records singles
Warner Records singles
Ministry of Sound singles
All Around the World Productions singles
Decca Records singles
604 Records singles
Interscope Records singles
Schoolboy Records singles
Aid songs for Africa
Songs involved in plagiarism controversies
Music videos directed by Giacomo De Simone